Forest now covers just over a quarter of Turkey,  but 4000 years ago most of the country was forested. The country is reforesting, which is important for the wildlife of Turkey.

History 

Forest cover before the formation of the Republic in 1923 is not well known. The first big afforestation project was in 1939.

Climate and forests 

Forest covers 23 million of Turkey's 78 million hectares, but 3 million hectares are unproductive (less than 10% crown cover). Almost all forest is state owned and managed by the General Directorate of Forestry of the Ministry of Agriculture and Forestry. The constitution prohibits forests being transferred from state ownership; however, private afforestation permits allow the private sector to reforest state land. Less than four thousand hectares a year are reforested by the private sector. 5% of forest is coppice and the rest high forest. There are also six million hectares of maquis, mostly in the south and west. High rainfall in the eastern Black Sea Region sustains temperate rainforest.  Drought in Turkey is a threat both directly and by encouraging bark beetles.

Forest products industry 
22 million cubic metres of wood was harvested in 2019. 20 million lira ( USD) support was provided to 765 families in 2019.

Distribution of forests 
A quarter of the Black Sea Region is forested, and other regions with over 10% forest are Marmara, Aegean, Mediterranean and East Anatolian.

The most common species are: cedar (2%), juniper (3%), fir (3%), scotch pine (7%), beech (9%), larch (22%), oak (24%) and red pine (27% - 5.9 million ha).

Wildfires in Turkey are increasing in some regions due to climate change in Turkey.

Benefits of forests 
Most forests are natural and semi-natural, on mountains and have a lot of biodiversity, hosting most species of the flora of Turkey and fauna of Turkey, including Anatolian leopards. Deciduous forests are along the Black Sea region. Species in various ecoregions in Turkey, namely Irano-Turanion, Mediterranean and Euro-Siberian, belong to about 800 woody taxa. The predominant species are Turkish pine (Pinus brutia), Black pine (Pinus nigra), European red pine (Pinus silvestris), Fir ( Abies spp.), Caucasian Spruce (Picea orientalis), Cedar of Lebanon (Cedrus libani), Juniper (Juniperus spp.), Stone pine (Pinus pinea), Mediterranean cypress (Cupressus sempervirens), Aleppo pine (Pinus halepensis), Oriental beech (Fagus orientalis), Oak (Quercus spp.), Alder (Alnus spp.), Sweet Chestnut (Castanea sativa), Hornbeam (Carpinus betulus).

Over 20% of forests are certified by the Forest Stewardship Council, and in 2019 more round wood was exported than imported.

Forests are the country's main carbon sink, in western Turkey mostly as living biomass rather than soil organic carbon, and are estimated to have absorbed 84 million tonnes of the 500 million tonnes of greenhouse gas emissions by Turkey in 2019.  the government did not have enough expertise to easily issue reforestation carbon certificates for the Clean Development Mechanism.

The World Bank says, "Increasing forest cover and improving forest health can help prevent soil erosion and landslides and reduce the impacts of floods."

Reforestation 
As some reforestation attempts have suffered due to lack of water desalination has been suggested.

References

External links 
 General Directorate of Forestry
 Global Forest Resources Assessment at Food and Agriculture Organization
 Global Forest Resources Assessment 2020 country report at Food and Agriculture Organization
Forests of Turkey